A skill is the learned capacity to carry out pre-determined results.

Skill may also refer to:

Skill (labor), a measure of a worker's abilities
The Skill, an album by The Sherbs
Skill F.C. de Bruxelles, a defunct Belgian football (soccer) club
Skills (company), a San Francisco, California, U.S., event promoter, record label and store
Cadence SKILL, a scripting language
USS Skill, at least two ships of the United States Navy
Forecast skill, a scaled representation of forecast error compared to a reference model
Skill, in role-playing game statistics, the learned knowledge and abilities of a character
Skill: National Bureau for Students With Disabilities, a UK charity for students with disabilities

See also
 Skil (disambiguation)
 Skillz (disambiguation)